The women's 4 × 100 metre freestyle relay swimming competition at the 2002 Asian Games in Busan was held on 3 October at the Sajik Swimming Pool.

Schedule
All times are Korea Standard Time (UTC+09:00)

Records

Results

References 

2002 Asian Games Report, Pages 227–228
Results

Swimming at the 2002 Asian Games